Merck refers primarily to the German Merck family and three companies founded by the family, including:
 the Merck Group, a German chemical, pharmaceutical and life sciences company founded in 1668
 Merck Serono (known as EMD Serono in the United States and Canada), a pharmaceutical company headquartered in Darmstadt, Germany, and a brand and division of Merck focused on biopharmaceuticals
 Merck & Co., Inc. (known as MSD (Merck Sharp & Dohme) outside North America), an American pharmaceutical company and a former subsidiary of the German Merck company, as founded in 1891/1917
 H. J. Merck & Co., a German bank founded in 1799

Merck may also refer to:

People
Carl Merck (1809–1880), Syndicus (foreign affairs head) of the Free City of Hamburg
Ernst Merck (1811–1863), German businessman and politician
George W. Merck (1894–1957), American president of Merck & Co.
Heinrich Emanuel Merck (1794–1855), German apothecary whose descendants were the founders of Merck chemical companies
Johann Heinrich Merck (1741–1791), German author and critic
William Merck (1852–1925), British commissioner in India

Publications
 Merck Manual of Diagnosis and Therapy, a 1899 medical textbook published by Merck & Co.
 Merck Index, a 1968 encyclopedia of chemistry, formerly published by Merck & Co. and now by the Royal Society of Chemistry
 Merck Veterinary Manual, a reference manual of animal health care published by Merck & Co. and Merial Limited

Other
Merck Finck & Co., a German private bank
Johann-Heinrich-Merck-Preis, a literary prize of Hesse, Germany
Merck Records, an IDM and experimental hip hop record label based in Miami, Florida, USA
Merck-Saint-Liévin, a commune in the Pas-de-Calais department, France

See also
mIRC
Merc (disambiguation)
Merk (disambiguation)